Gastroblasta is a genus of cnidarians belonging to the family Campanulariidae.

The species of this genus are found in Southern Europe and Central America.

Species:

Gastroblasta ovale 
Gastroblasta raffaelei 
Gastroblasta timida

References

Campanulariidae
Hydrozoan genera